Bernard Delvaille (1 December 1931 – 18 April 2006) was a French poet, essayist, translator and anthologist.

From 1962 on, he worked with Pierre Seghers on the collection "Poètes d'aujourd'hui" until Robert Laffont bought the editions in 1969. He then managed the collection until 1989.

His involvement in publishing was reinforced by his participation in the Centre national des Lettres from 1975 to 1983 in the commissions "Poésie" and "Revue". His literary knowledge led him to become a literary critic and give lectures for the Alliances Françaises and in several universities like Brussels, Lisbon, Rome or Toronto. In addition to these oratorical exercises, he was the author of numerous articles in magazines such as Combat, Les Lettres Françaises, Le Figaro Littéraire, Le Magazine Littéraire and La Revue des Deux Mondes. Finally, he was one of the juries of the Prix Guillaume Apollinaire and the Prix Max Jacob, was a member of the Académie Mallarmé and held the post of President of the "Association internationale des Amis de Valery Larbaud". He won the Prix Valery Larbaud in 1985 for his entire body of work.

His first book was devoted to Valery Larbaud and awarded the prix Sainte-Beuve in 1963. This work was followed by other studies on Johannes Brahms, Samuel Taylor Coleridge, Théophile Gautier, Paul Morand and Mathieu Bénézet, where one could notice an attraction for the romanticism and modernity of the early twentieth century. In addition to these monographs, his work was distinguished as that of an anthologist, since he was the author of three works that have become classics and hailed as such by critics: La Poésie symboliste (Bernard Delvaille will be rewarded with the Prix Henri-Mondor in 1983 for his work on symbolism and Mallarmé), La Nouvelle poésie française, which drew up an inventory of poetic hopes in the mid-1970s and Mille et cent ans de poésie française, a sum of more than a thousand pages listing the great poets from the eleventh to the mid-twentieth.

Delvaille was the author of a poetic work published in 2006 in which he developed the themes of journey, wandering, happiness and death.

Poetry 
1951: Blues, Paris, éditions Escales
1955: Train de vie, Paris, éditions Paragraphes
1957: Enfance, mon amour, Rodez, éditions Subervie
1958: Tout objet aimé est le centre d’un paradis, Paris, éditions Millas-Martin
1967: Désordre, Seghers
1976: Faits divers, Seghers
1978: Le Vague à l’âme de la Royal Navy, Paris, La Répétition
1980: Blanche est l’écharpe d’Yseut, Mont-de-Marsan, Cahiers des Brisants
1980: La Dernière légende lyrique, Mauregny-en-Haye, Cahiers de Mauregny
1982: Poèmes (1951–1981), Seghers
1989: Panicauts ou le voyage d'été, Vitry-sur-Seine, éditions Monologue
2006: Œuvre poétique, Paris, La Table ronde,

Stories, novels, diary 
1971: La Saison perdue, Paris, Éditions Gallimard
1982: Les Derniers outrages, Paris, Flammarion, 
1988: Séparés, on est ensemble, followed by Le Plus Secret Amour, Montpellier, Fata Morgana
1989: Le Plaisir solitaire, 1st ed., Paris, Le Temps qu'il fait, 2005 
1995: Le Temps provisoire, Paris, Salvy, 
2000: Journal, tome 1 : 1942-1962, La Table Ronde
2001: Journal, tome 2 : 1963-1977, La Table ronde, 
2003: Journal, tome 3 : 1978-1999, La Table ronde,

Essays 
1963: Essai sur Valery Larbaud, Seghers
1963: Coleridge, Seghers
1965: Johannes Brahms, Seghers
1966: Paul Morand, Seghers
1968: Théophile Gautier, Seghers. Reprint Rouen, tirages limités, 2003 
1980: Paris, ses poètes, ses chansons, Paris, Robert Laffont
1981: Le Piéton de Paris. Passages et galeries du 19e siècle, with photos by Robert Doisneau, Paris, éditions ACE
1983: Londres, Seyssel, Champ Vallon
1984: Mathieu Bénézet, Paris
1985: Bordeaux, Seyssel, Champ Vallon
2004: Pages sur le livre, Paris, Éditions des Cendres
2006: Duchamp libre, Paris, L'Échoppe
2007: Vies parallèles de Blaise Cendrars & de Charles-Albert Cingria, Paris, La Bibliothèque

Anthologies 
1971: La Poésie symboliste, Seghers
1974: La Nouvelle poésie française, Seghers
1991: Mille et cent ans de poésie française, Paris, Robert Laffont, Bouquins, 
2004: Le Goût de Londres, Paris, Mercure de France,

External links 
 Bernard Delvaille, poète et critique (obituary) on Le Monde (24 April 2006)
 Bernard Delvaille : Oeuvre poétique on INA.fr (30 March 2006)
 Bernard Delvaille on the site of the Académie française
 Bernard Delvaille on Florilège

21st-century French writers
20th-century French essayists
21st-century French essayists
20th-century French poets
French literary critics
Sciences Po alumni
French diarists
Prix Sainte-Beuve winners
1931 births
Writers from Bordeaux
2006 deaths
20th-century diarists